This list comprises all players who have participated in at least one league match for Houston Leones since the team's first season in the USL Premier Development League in 2008. Players who were on the roster but never played a first team game are not listed; players who appeared for the team in other competitions (US Open Cup, etc.) but never actually made an USL appearance are noted at the bottom of the page where appropriate.

A
  Erick Acevedo
  Fatai Alabi
  Jay Ambrosy
  Manuel Arellano
  Anthony Ashiofu
  Carlos Ayala

B
  Edgar Bear
  Israel Becerra
  Fernando Benitez
  Luis Bernal

C
  Julio Chaves
  Antonio Chávez
  Vincenzo Cox

D
  Ryan Dempsey
  Alejandro Diaz
  Christopher Dodd
  Eric Domínguez
  Brandon Durden

E
  Michael Enriquez
  Trevor Eastman

F
  Elton Flores
  Benjamin Floyd
  Martin Fuentes

G
  Carlos German

H
  Brian Harper
  Ángel Hernandez
  Jose Luis Hernández
  Juan Carlos Hernández
  Miguel Hurtado

J
  Ash-Lee Michael James
  Vladimir Jáuregui
  Robin Johnson-Hood

K
  Ross Kelly
  Ljubomir Kocic

L
  Matthew Lewis
  Jonathan Lopez
  Salvador Luviano

M
  Jad Masri
  Christopher Meyer
  José Antonio Miranda
  Michael Moore
  Juan Morales
  Victor Morales
  Mike Mota
  Alphonse Mudoh
  Arie Muniz

N
  Sebastian Narvaez
  Juan Nava
  Harry Newman

O
  Travis Ogogor
  Efrain Orozco

Q
  Eric Quill

R
  Leandro Reis
  Rodrigo Arnoldo Rivas
  Francisco Rodriguez
  Hugo Rodriguez
  Julio Rodriguez
  John “Dave” Ruff

S
  Agustin Sandoval
  George Sangira
  Ousainou Senghore
  Tom Shaw
  Stephen Sifuentes
  Lukas Simon
  Jose Soto
  Sergio Soto
  Matt Strine
  Ricardo Sutherland

V
  Otto Valdez
  Walberto Vasquez
  Jeuel Ventura

W
  Zachary Wallace
  Michael Wamo

Sources

Houston Leones
 
Association football player non-biographical articles